András Baranyecz (23 February 1946 – 5 January 2010) was a Hungarian cyclist. He competed in the men's sprint and the men's tandem events at the 1968 Summer Olympics.

References

External links 
 
 
 
 

1946 births
2010 deaths
Hungarian male cyclists
Olympic cyclists of Hungary
Cyclists at the 1968 Summer Olympics
Cyclists from Budapest